Saathiya (English: Companion) is a 2002 Indian Hindi-language romantic drama film directed by Shaad Ali and produced by Mani Ratnam and Yash Chopra under the banner of Yash Raj Films. The film stars Rani Mukerji and Vivek Oberoi, with Shah Rukh Khan and Tabu in cameos. The soundtrack was composed by A. R. Rahman and the lyrics are penned by Gulzar. It is a remake of the Tamil film Alaipayuthey whose climax was reported to be inspired by the 1998 film Sliding Doors and which was also directed by Mani Ratnam with music composed by Rahman as well. Box Office India declared the film a Hit. Additionally, the film won 6 Filmfare Awards.

Plot 
Aditya Sehgal and his friends are searching for Aditya's wife Suhani Sehgal. She has been missing for hours, a few days after having a fight with Aditya about their failing marriage. But Aditya now realizes that he loves her more than anything and is devastated that he can't find her.

The film goes into a flashback, where it is seen that Aditya and Dr. Suhani meet each other at a wedding. Aditya immediately falls in love with her and pursues her. Suhani at first believes that he is simply flirting with her but later, both realize that they love each other. However, Aditya's rich lifestyle and Suhani's middle-class lifestyle creates a rift between their parents where Aditya's father Om Sehgal insults Suhani's father. Aditya and Suhani elope and get married in a small ceremony. At first, they live in their respective homes and keep their marriage a secret. However, when a proposal comes for Suhani's elder sister, the truth comes out. Aditya and Suhani then cut ties with their parents and move to a dilapidated house and start their married life together.

Soon, marital problems threaten to drive them apart. A misunderstanding causes Suhani to think Aditya is having an affair and they get into a major argument. Suhani then gets involved in a car accident. As she is crossing the street, a car hits her, almost fatally injuring her. Aditya has no idea of this and waits for her to return home, happily thinking that they will patch up.

Later Aditya realizes that Suhani is missing and starts looking for her. It is revealed that Savitri is the one who hit Suhani with her car. Scared to own up, Savitri calls her husband, who is an IAS officer. Her husband, Yeshwant Rao, arrives at the hospital and tells the doctor that Suhani is his wife and he wants her operated. Aditya finds out about the incident and reaches the hospital. Suhani falls into a coma. Yeshwant explains to Aditya, and takes the blame and tells him that he had caused the accident. Aditya threatens Yeshwant and leaves. Savitri meets Aditya and tells him that it was she who caused the accident and she is feeling guilty.

The two shed tears together until Yeshwant comes and picks her up. Soon, Suhani regains consciousness. Aditya runs in and expresses the pain and suffering he went through in the hours of separation. Suhani also expresses her own love and feelings for him. The film ends as Aditya and Suhani finally makeup and they hug each other on the hospital bed.

Cast 

Rani Mukerji as Suhani Sharma
Vivek Oberoi as Aditya Sehgal
Shahrukh Khan as Yeshwant Rao (special appearance)
Tabu as Savitri Rao (special appearance)
Kunal Kumar as Bhaskar
Sandhya Mridul as Dina Sharma, Suhani’s sister
Sharat Saxena as Chandra Prakash Sharma, Suhani’s father 
Tanuja as Shobhana Sharma, Suhani’s mother
Satish Shah as Barrister Om Sehgal, Aditya’s father 
Swaroop Sampat as Shanti Sehgal, Aditya’s mother
Anju Mahendru as Prema
Aditya Srivastava as A.C.P.
Rahul Chauhan as COP Rahul Patil
Shamita Shetty in a special appearance in the song "Chori Pe Chori"
Aarya Mehta as Pinky
Ujjwal Rana as Raghunath "Raghu" Pandit
Pubali Sanyali as Anju
Paritosh Sand as Ved
Tinnu Anand as Daruwala
Deepraj Rana as Inspector
Deepak Qazir as Raghu's father
Jaya Bhattacharya as Vidya
Karthik Kumar as Shyam
Mansi Upadhyay as Lady in hospital
Manu Rishi Chadha as Doctor
Paritosh Sand as Ved

Soundtrack

There are 9 songs composed by A. R. Rahman and lyrics by Gulzar. A. R. Rahman re-used all of his compositions from the soundtrack of the Tamil film Alaipayuthey, with the exception of two songs, "Mere Yaar Mila De" and "Naina Milaike" which replaced their Tamil counterparts "Evano Oruvan" and "Alaipayuthey". The soundtrack turned out to be one of the strong points of the film. Saathiya won most of the music awards, despite facing tough competition from Devdas (2002). A. R. Rahman and Sonu Nigam won Best Music Director and Best Male Playback for "Saathiya", respectively. According to the Indian trade website Box Office India, with around 20,00,000 units sold, this film's soundtrack album was the year's second highest-selling, behind Devdas.

For the soundtrack, the songs, "Alaipayuthey" and "Evano Oruvan" were not re-composed from the Tamil version. Instead, Rahman composed a Sufi track "Mere Yaar Mila De" and "Naina Milaike", a classical number. Lyricist Gulzar, who wrote all the Hindi version songs, stated, "In Saathiya I wrote 'Mere Yaar Mila De', which isn't a typical romantic number though it's essentially a love song." Unlike previous soundtracks recorded by Rahman for Ratnam, the former composed majority of the songs by fusing the classical carnatic music genres into moderns rhythms.

On penning review for Bollywood Hungama, critic Taran Adarsh stated, "A.R. Rahman's music is melodious and easy on the ears. The title track is the pick of the lot, but the item song can easily be deleted, for it serves as a speed breaker in the goings-on. Perhaps, even this song was added to add spice." Critic based at Australian Cine Urban praised the music, "A superb digital sound mix drives the all important soundtrack, fantasy music video clips on the cable music channels in that they are multi-costume and multi-location showpieces, taking us from waterfalls to snowy mountain fields to idyllic shorelines. Duets and full scale wedding routines follow each other as the first half zips along with its charter to set the musical mood." Vijay Ramanan of Planet Bollywood, "A. R. Rahman's music and score, while simply re-created from the original except for two songs is as usual – fantastic. Mr. Brown reviewed the music of the film, "The songs-chiefly are the lilting title number; the percussive wedding song "Chhalka Chhalka Re" ("It Spilled"); and the seductive ballads "Chupke Se" ("Quietly") and "Aye Udi Udi Udi" ("Flew Away") a highlight. Glamsham pointed, "All in all, all praises to the music composition by A R Rahman; the music is unique and upbeat. A R Rahman has been successful in creating a different genre of music for his ever increasing list of fans. The lyrics is definitely getting subdued by the exciting music. A must buy for people who love new music".

Awards
48th Filmfare Awards:
Won
Best Actress (Critics) – Rani Mukerji
 Best Music Director – A..R. Rahman
 Best Lyricist – Gulzar for "Saathiya"
 Best Male Playback Singer – Sonu Nigam for "Saathiya"
 Best Screenplay – Mani Ratnam
Best Dialogue – Gulzar
Nominated

 Best Actress – Rani Mukerji
 Best Actor – Vivek Oberoi
Zee Cine Awards
 Zee Cine Award for Best Music Director – A..R. Rahman
 Zee Cine Award for Best Lyricist – Gulzar for "Saathiya"
 Zee Cine Award Best Playback Singer- Male – Sonu Nigam for "Saathiya"
 Best Sound – Robert Taylor

IIFA
 IIFA Best Music Director – A. R. Rahman
 IIFA Best Male Playback – Sonu Nigam for "Saathiya"

MTV Immies
 Best Composer – A. R. Rahman
 Best Lyrics: Gulzar for "Saathiya"
 Best Singer (Male) – Sonu Nigam for "Saathiya"

Bollywood Music Awards
 Best Male Singer – Sonu Nigam for "Saathiya"

Bollywood Movie Awards
 Best Actress (Critics) – Rani Mukerji
 Best Music Director – A. R. Rahman

Sansui Awards
 Best Actress (Jury) – Rani Mukerji
 Best Music Director – A. R. Rahman
 Best Male Playback – Sonu Nigam for "Saathiya"

References

External links

2002 films
2000s Hindi-language films
Indian romantic musical films
Hindi remakes of Tamil films
Yash Raj Films films
Films scored by A. R. Rahman
Indian romantic drama films
2002 directorial debut films
Films directed by Shaad Ali
2002 romantic drama films
2000s romantic musical films